The Ready Room is an American aftershow on Paramount+ in which a host discusses episodes of a first-run Star Trek television series on the service (previously CBS All Access) with cast and crew members from the series. It replaced a previous aftershow, After Trek, which was live streamed on All Access following episodes of the first season of Star Trek: Discovery. The series is also made for Facebook Live.

CBS revealed plans in January 2019 to re-imagine After Trek for the second season of Discovery, and announced The Ready Room shortly after. Naomi Kyle hosted the aftershow for that season. In January 2020, Wil Wheaton was named as host for a second season of The Ready Room that serves as an aftershow for the first season of the series Star Trek: Picard. Wheaton returned to host aftershow episodes for the series Star Trek: Lower Decks, Star Trek: Prodigy, the third and fourth seasons of Discovery, the second and third seasons of Star Trek: Picard, and Star Trek: Strange New Worlds.

In addition to Facebook Live, The Ready Room is released on IGTV, YouTube, and on Paramount+ for subscribers.

Development
CBS announced an aftershow companion series to its CBS All Access television series Star Trek: Discovery in May 2017. Titled After Trek, it was hosted by Matt Mira and streamed live on All Access following the release of Discovery episodes. By June 2018, with production on the second season of Discovery underway, CBS was "reimagining" After Trek for the next season. The network said the next iteration would "continue to have all the fan-driven elements that Star Trek: Discovery viewers enjoyed this season and more."

In January 2019, CBS announced that After Trek had been canceled and was being replaced by weekly Facebook Live events to be streamed the day after each Discovery episode was released. These Facebook Live events were soon revealed to be a new interview-style aftershow named The Ready Room, hosted by Naomi Kyle. The title comes from the captain's private room onboard many Star Trek starships. In January 2020, CBS announced a second season of The Ready Room would serve as the aftershow for its new series Star Trek: Picard, with former Star Trek: The Next Generation cast member Wil Wheaton taking over as host for the season.

Wheaton returned for a bonus episode, recorded remotely due to the COVID-19 pandemic, that focuses on the making of the first season of Picard. It was released in July 2020. Wheaton then hosted several special episodes of The Ready Room that accompany key episodes of the new animated series Star Trek: Lower Decks, before hosting a new season of The Ready Room with aftershows for each episode of the third season of Discovery.

In 2022 Wheaton returned as host for the second season of Picard. He also hosts aftershows for the third season in 2023, though was omitted from the season's announced Next Generation cast reunion. He has preferred writing and hosting to acting, and said in 2020 that he only takes "incredible" roles he "feels really good about". Wheaton returns as Wesley Crusher in Picards second-season finale, which he discusses in the aftershow for the premiere of Star Trek: Strange New Worlds.

Episodes

Discovery season 2 (2019)

The first season of The Ready Room is an aftershow for the second season of Star Trek: Discovery, with Naomi Kyle as host. Episodes were released the day after an episode of Discovery, on Facebook Live as well as CBS All Access.

Picard season 1 (2020)

The second season of The Ready Room is an aftershow for the first season of Star Trek: Picard, with Wil Wheaton as host. Episodes were released hours after an episode of Picard, free-to-air on Facebook Live, IGTV, and YouTube as well as on CBS All Access for subscribers.

Lower Decks season 1 (2020)

A special episode of The Ready Room, with Wil Wheaton returning as host, was released following the premiere of Star Trek: Lower Decks. Another aftershow episode was released following the sixth episode, and a virtual panel for the 2020 New York Comic Con was recorded as a third aftershow for the series following its season finale.

Discovery season 3 (2020–21)

This season of The Ready Room serves as an aftershow for the third season of Star Trek: Discovery, hosted by Wil Wheaton.

Lower Decks season 2 (2021)

Prodigy season 1 (2021–22)

Discovery season 4 (2021–22)

Picard season 2 (2022)

Strange New Worlds season 1 (2022)

Lower Decks season 3 (2022)

Picard season 3 (2023)

References

2010s American television talk shows
2019 American television series debuts
2020s American television talk shows
Aftershows
Paramount+ original programming
Star Trek television series
Star Trek: Discovery
Star Trek: Picard